Temple B'rith Kodesh is a Reform synagogue in Rochester, New York.  It is the oldest synagogue  and the largest Reform congregation in the greater Rochester area.

History

Temple B'rith Kodesh was founded in 1848 as an Orthodox congregation with 12 members. By 1894 the congregation had grown to over 250 members and a building was purchased in downtown Rochester. During this period, a gradual change from Orthodoxy to Classical Reform began. In 1975, Gates of Prayer replaced The Union Prayer Book, and both English and Hebrew were used in the services. In 1996, a gender sensitive edition of Gates of Prayer was adopted for use.

Simchat Torah was an especially joyous occasion in 1962 when Temple B'rith Kodesh dedicated a new building in the suburb of Brighton, our current home. By this time, the membership had grown to 1200 families and was still growing.

Rabbi Felix A. Levy was rabbi of the Temple from 1907 to 1908.

Temple B'rith Kodesh has enjoyed a long and illustrious history in terms of our congregation and our clergy. In the many years since our inception, we have served as a training ground for many Assistant Rabbis, but have employed only six Senior Rabbis: Dr. Max Landsberg, Rabbi Horace Wolf, Rabbi Philip S. Bernstein, Rabbi Judea B. Miller, Rabbi Laurence A. Kotok and Rabbi Peter W. Stein. All have been beloved by our congregation and have achieved national and international recognition.

Many of our Assistant and Associate Rabbis have also gone on to exciting careers within the Union for Reform Judaism (or as formerly known, the UAHC.) They include Rabbi Herbert Bronstein, Rabbi Ronald Shapiro, Rabbi Rosalind Gold, Rabbi Judy Cohen-Rosenberg, Rabbi Brian Daniels, Rabbi Marc Gruber, Rabbi S. Robert Morais, Rabbi Rebecca Gutterman, Rabbi Alison Kobey, Rabbi Kelly Levy, and Rabbi Rochelle Tulik.

We have had a Cantor at various times in our history and at other times we have employed Cantorial Soloists. Past Cantors have include Cantor Stephen Richards, Cantor David Unterman, Cantor Richard Allen, Cantor Barbara Horowitz, Cantor Martha Birnbaum and Cantor Joel Colman. Currently, Keri Lopatin Berger serves as our Cantorial Soloist and Director of Music. (time said is 2018–2020) 

When Rabbi Philip S. Bernstein became Senior Rabbi in 1926, the temple was located on Gibbs Street in the downtown area of Rochester. More traditional observances were adopted by the congregation, including:PHILIP S. BERNSTEIN PAPERS, University of Rochester</ref>  The congregation maintains a section in the historic Mount Hope Cemetery, Rochester.

Architecture

The Temple's current building was designed by architect Pietro Belluschi.  The sanctuary  is roofed with a domed wooden drum intended to evoke the Wooden synagogues of Poland. Sculptor Luise Kaish was commissioned to create the Temple's ark, which Samuel Gruber calls “one of the major works of the last half century . . . even today the presence of Kaish’s figures on the ark is an exciting shock” in American Synagogues: A Century of Architecture and Jewish Community.

Art collection

The Temple has a noted collection of menorahs by contemporary artists including Salvador Dalí.

Presidents
Meyer Rothschild	1848-1854	 	Milton Berger	1963-1965
Elias Wolff	1854-1872	 	Louis Perlman	1965-1968
Joseph Wile	1872-1874	 	Emanuel Goldberg	1968-1970
Moses Hays	1874-1877	 	Henry Rubens	1970-1973
Levi Adler	1877-1879	 	Murray Blanchard	1973-1976
David Rosenberg	1879-1880	 	Herbert Schwartz	1976-1978
Leopold Garson	 1880-1882	 	Warren Heilbronner	 1978-1980
I.M. Sloman	1882-1884	 	Charles Chadwick	 1980-1982
Julius Wile	1884-1886	 	Lawrence Scott	1982-1984
Henry Michaels	1886-1888	 	Thomas Fink 	1984-1986
Leopold Garson	1888-1891	 	Morris Weinstein	1986-1989
Joseph Cauffman	1891-1892	 	Annette Sheiman 	1989-1991
Henry Michaels	1892-1894	 	Donald Onimus	 1991-1993
William Miller	1894	 	Gerald Zakalik	1993-1995
Max Lowenthal	1894-1901	 	David Feinstein	1995-1997
Sol Wile	1901-1912	 	Carol Yunker	1997-1999
Max Lowenthal	1912-1915	 	Stuart Boyar	1999-2001
Mortimer Adler	1915-1921	 	Michael Snyder	2001-2003
Sol Applebaum	1921-1928	 	Philip Fain	2003-2005
Henry Stern	1928-1937	 	F. Kenneth Greene	2005-2009
Manuel Goldman	1937-1948	 	Janet Fink	2009-2011
J.H. Rubens	 1948-1954	 	Robert Mevorach	2001-2013
Garson Meyer	1954-1957	 	Lou Spiro	2013-2016
Hyman Freeman	1957-1960	 	Daniel Mendelson	2016-2018
Clifford Lovenheim	1960-1963	 	Steven Chaba	2018-2020

Image
 http://www.nextbook.org/cultural/feature.html?id=2475

References

Classical Reform Judaism
Pietro Belluschi buildings
Reform synagogues in New York (state)